"Eternal White" is MAX's 24th single on the Avex Trax label. The single was their first after a brief hiatus following the departure of lead singer, Mina in March, 2002. It was also their first single with Aki who joined the group in July, 2002. The title track is a bossa nova influenced winter love song. It features a rap section performed by members Lina and Nana, who also wrote the lyrics. It was their first single to be released in a copy-protected format.

Track list

Production

Music 
 Recording Director: Kenichi Sakagami, Motohiko Kohno
 Mixing: Kohji Morimoto, Kenichi Nakamura
 Recording: Kenichi Nakamura
 Mastering: Tetsuya Yamamoto

Artwork 
 Art direction: Shinichi Hara
 Design: Tomokazu Suzuki
 Photography: Minoru Ogishima
 Styling: Akemi Muto
 Hair & Make-up: Maki Tawa

Charts
Oricon Sales Chart (Japan)

2002 singles
MAX (band) songs
2002 songs